Bnei  may refer to:

Places
Bnei Atarot, moshav in Central District
Bnei Atzmon, Israeli settlement
Bnei Ayish, town in Central District
Bnei Brak, city in Tel Aviv District
Bnei Darom, moshav in Central District
Bnei Dror, moshav in Central District
Bnei Re'em, moshav in Central District
Bnei Shimon Regional Council, regional council in the northern Negev
Bnei Zion, moshav in Central District

Sport
Bnei al-Salam Rahat F.C., football club
F.C. Bnei Arraba, football club
Bnei Herzliya, basketball club
F.C. Bnei M.M.B.E. HaGolan VeHaGalil, football club
Bnei Sakhnin F.C., football club

Other uses
Bnei Akiva, Zionist youth movement
Bnei Menashe, Jewish ethnic group
Bandai Namco Entertainment, video game publisher

See also
Bene Israel (India)